Juho Mielonen (born 1 March 1987) is a Finnish professional ice hockey defenceman who currently plays for HPK of the SM-liiga. Mielonen was drafted 175th overall by the Detroit Red Wings in the 2005 NHL Entry Draft.

Career statistics

Regular season and playoffs

International

References

External links

1987 births
Living people
Ässät players
Detroit Red Wings draft picks
Finnish ice hockey defencemen
People from Savonlinna
Sportspeople from South Savo